The 2016 Women's Volleyball Thai-Denmark Super League 2016 was the fourth edition of the tournament. It was held at the MCC Hall of The Mall Bangkapi in Bangkok, Thailand from 23 – 28 March 2016.

Teams
  Bangkok Glass
  Idea Khonkaen
  Nakhon Ratchasima
  Supreme Chonburi E-Tech
  3BB Nakhonnont
  King-Bangkok
  Petron-PSL All Stars

Pools composition

Preliminary round

Pool A

|}

|}

Pool B

|}

|}

Final round

Semifinals

|}

Final

|}

Final standing

See also 
 2016 Men's Volleyball Thai-Denmark Super League

References

Women's,2016
Thai-Denmark Super League
Volleyball,Women's Thai-Denmark Super League